The Heirs is a 2008 Russian drama film directed by Konstantin Odegov.

Plot 
The plot focuses on an ordinary family living in one village in the taiga. Father works as a driller and mother as a nurse. It would seem that everything is fine with them, but suddenly father begins to drink and draws his wife into it, leaving his son without supervision.

Cast 
 Aleksandr Bashirov
 Yuliya Galkina
 Aleksandr Golubkov
 Denis Karasyov
 Leonid Kuravlyov
 Yekaterina Rednikova
 Vladimir Tolokonnikov	
 Pavel Yurchenko
 Amadu Mamadakov

References

External links 
 

2008 films
2000s Russian-language films
Russian drama films
2008 drama films